URR or Urr may refer to:
Urea reduction ratio, used to quantify dialysis treatment adequacy
Urr Water, a river in Scotland
Haugh of Urr, a village by the Urr Water, in the Urr parish
Motte of Urr, a "motte-and-bailey" castle near the Haugh of Urr, beside the Urr Water
Union Railroad is a name, or part of a name, that has been used by many companies, mainly in the US
Union Railroad (Pennsylvania) is possibly the only current user of that name 
Underground Railroad, an informal escape network used by 19th-century black slaves in the US
 Ultima Ratio Regum, a historical roguelike game